The 2000 season was the Philadelphia Eagles' 68th in the National Football League and their second under head coach Andy Reid. They improved on their 5–11 record from 1999 and resulted in a postseason appearance for the first time since 1996. Their season started in Dallas, with the game famously known for the onside kick that the Eagles kicked and recovered to start the game. This game is known as the Pickle Juice Game, as the Philadelphia players were given pickle juice by Andy Reid in order to prepare for the high temperature in Dallas that day. The Eagles won the game, 41–14.

This was Donovan McNabb's first full year as starting quarterback after seeing limited action during his rookie season. With McNabb, the team posted an 11–5 record. For his efforts, McNabb was named to the Pro Bowl following the season. He would make several more Pro Bowl appearances during his time in Philadelphia. The Eagles played in five NFC Championship games and a Super Bowl (2004) during the McNabb era.

The Eagles easily defeated the Tampa Bay Buccaneers in the wild-card round of the playoffs, 21–3, but lost to their rivals, the eventual NFC champion New York Giants, in the divisional round 20–10.

In Week 5, running back Duce Staley broke his foot. He was later placed on injured reserve, ending his season. He rushed for 344 yards while active in five games.

Offseason

NFL draft 

The 2000 NFL Draft was held April 15–16, 2000. No teams elected to claim any players in the supplemental draft that year. The draft was 7 rounds again.

The Eagles held the 6th pick in the draft in the 7 rounds. They made a total of 7 selections in the draft.

Player selections 
The table shows the Eagles selections and what picks they had that were traded away and the team that ended up with that pick. It is possible the Eagles' pick ended up with this team via another team that the Eagles made a trade with.
Not shown are acquired picks that the Eagles traded away.

Staff

Roster

Regular season

Schedule 

Note: Intra-division opponents are in bold text.

Standings

Playoffs

Schedule

Game summaries

NFC Wild Card Game

NFC Divisional Playoff

Awards and honors 
 Andy Reid, 2000 Sporting News Coach of Year
 Andy Reid, 2000 Maxwell Football Club NFL Coach of Year

References

External links 
 2000 Philadelphia Eagles at Pro-Football-Reference.com

Philadelphia Eagles seasons
Philadelphia Eagles
Philadelphia Eagles